The Realm of Fortune is a 1986 Mexican drama film directed by Arturo Ripstein. The film was selected as the Mexican entry for the Best Foreign Language Film at the 59th Academy Awards, but was not accepted as a nominee.

Cast
 Ernesto Gómez Cruz as Dionisio Pinzón
 Blanca Guerra as La Caponera
 Alejandro Parodi as Lorenzo Benavides
 Zaide Silvia Gutiérrez as La Pinzona
 Socorro Avelar as Madre de Dionisio
 Juan Antonio Llanes as Cura de San Miguel
 Carlos Cardán as Don Isabel
 Loló Navarro as Doña Iris

See also
 List of submissions to the 59th Academy Awards for Best Foreign Language Film
 List of Mexican submissions for the Academy Award for Best Foreign Language Film

References

External links
 

1986 films
1986 drama films
1980s Spanish-language films
Mexican drama films
Films directed by Arturo Ripstein
1980s Mexican films